The Little Plains River, a perennial river of the Snowy River catchment, is located in the Snowy Mountains region of New South Wales, Australia.

Course and features
The Little Plains River is formed by the confluence of the Queensborough River and the Bendoc River near the locality of Bendoc Upper, south southeast of Delegate. The river flows generally north northeast and west northwest, joined by three minor tributaries before reaching its confluence with the Delegate River near Balgownie, between Delegate and Bombala. The river descends  over its  course.

See also

 Rivers of New South Wales
 List of rivers of New South Wales (L-Z)
 List of rivers of Australia

References

Rivers of New South Wales
Snowy Mountains